NGC 6337, the Ghostly Cheerio or Cheerio Nebula, is a toroidal  planetary nebula in the constellation Scorpius. It appears as a ring-shaped (annular) transparent nebula resembling a piece of the breakfast cereal Cheerios, hence the name. Filament and knots, and a faint shell surround the ring. Its magnitude is 11.90; its position in Scorpius is right ascension 17h 22m15.67s, declination -38° 29' 01.73". The Ghostly Cheerio has a redshift value of -0.000236.

There is convincing evidence that a binary nucleus exists at the center of the nebula, with masses of 0.6 and 0.3 M⊙, and a separation of ≤ 1.26 R⊙, indicating a probable common envelope phase. The Ghostly Cheerio's projected radial expansion is slow, averaging .

See also 
 List of NGC objects (6001–7000)

References

Scorpius (constellation)
6337
Planetary nebulae